Death is the fourth officially released album/EP by Finnish black metal band Thy Serpent. It is the last heard of Thy Serpent since its release in 2000. It is also the first of their work to feature their current lineup, with Tomi Ullgren on lead, and the new drummer. It was recorded at a different studio than the three previous CDs.

Track listing

Credits
Azhemin - Vocals / bass guitar / keyboards
Sami Tenetz - Rhythm guitar / Vocals
Tomi Ullgren - Guitar
Teemu Laitinen - Drums

References

External links

2000 EPs
Thy Serpent albums